Gordon Spice (18 April 1940 – 10 September 2021) was a British  racing driver who competed in both sports cars and Touring Car racing in the 1960s and 1970s, before starting Spice Engineering with fellow racing driver Ray Bellm in the 1980s.

Racing career 
Spice was most notable for his involvement with the Ford Capri, both as a driver and as part of Spice Engineering. Starting off his British Saloon Car Championship career racing Minis in the late 1960s for Downton Engineering Spice went on to paid drives in Minis for Jim Whitehouse’s Equipe Arden team in 1968 (winners of the British Saloon Car Championship title with a Mini the year later with Alec Poole) and raced John Cooper’s team Minis with Steve Neal in 1969 but despite Spice’s pace and occasional race win were outclassed by the 1300 Broadspeed Ford Escorts. 
Gordon eventually progressed to the works Ford team,  CC Developments, co-run by Dave Cook, running the Capri 3.0S. He won his class on five occasions between 1976 and 1980, but never won the championship outright. In all, he took 24 overall race victories. In 1980, he took on Andy Rouse as team mate, and the two dominated their class, only losing out on the title to Win Percy.

In the 1980s, Spice competed in the World Endurance Championship with his own cars, under the banner Spice Engineering, or those of Jean Rondeau. He won the C2 class in the World Championship in 1988.

Spice, as well as running a car accessory shop in Ashford (Middlesex), in the early days of car accessory retailing, he co-founded in 1971, with his brother Derek, Gordon Spice Cash And Carry. They supplied motor accessories to trade customers and, at the peak of the business, they had cash and carry depots in Staines, Watford, Canning Town and Leicester. Subsequent flotation as a PLC in 1986, and an over ambitious investment in a state of the art central distribution centre, plus changing market conditions, led to the demise of the company.

Personal life 
Spice died on 10 September 2021 from cancer, at the age of 81.

Racing record

Complete British Saloon Car Championship results
(key) (Races in bold indicate pole position; races in italics indicate fastest lap.)

† Events with 2 races staged for the different classes.

Complete Formula One non-championship results 
(key)

24 Hours of Le Mans results

References

External links
 Summary on Haynes Publishing

Further reading
 Jeremy Walton, Life of Spice: The Autobiography of Gordon Spice 

1940 births
2021 deaths
British Touring Car Championship drivers
24 Hours of Le Mans drivers
24 Hours of Spa drivers
Place of birth missing
World Sportscar Championship drivers
Sportspeople from London
Deaths from cancer in the United Kingdom